River of Gold is a 1971 American TV movie which was an ABC Movie of the Week.

The Los Angeles Times said it "looked as though people lost interest half way through".

Plot
Beach bums look for sunken treasure.

Cast
Ray Milland
Suzanne Pleshette
Dack Rambo

References

External links

1971 television films
1971 films
ABC Movie of the Week